Davi Sacer, stage name of Davi Amorim de Oliveira (Nova Iguaçu, November 30, 1975) is a Brazilian gospel singer, songwriter and multi-instrumentalist. He began his career in music at the age of eight when he became the lead singer of his older brother's band. His first album was Deus Não Falhará (God Won't Fail), released in 2008. Two years later, he recorded the album Confio Em Ti (I Trust in Thee). His discography also includes the work No Caminho do Milagre ("On the Path of the Miracle"), recorded live, and Às Margens do Teu Rio (At the Margins of Thy River), in 2012.

Beside the singer Luiz Arcanjo, Davi was lead singer of groups Toque no Altar and Trazendo a Arca. He worked for four years at Toque no Altar and another four in Trazendo a Arca, leaving both to devote to his solo career. Some of their songs caused controversy among Christian for his anthropocentric lyrics.

The artist is married to Veronica Sacer, who accompanies him on his travels and events, and sings a duet with him. Together, the couple has two children, Breno and Maressa. Davi Sacer is a member of Apascentar Church in Nova Iguaçu, located in the city of Nova Iguaçu.

Discography 
Solo
2008: Deus não Falhará
2010: Confio em Ti
2011: No Caminho do Milagre
2012: Às Margens do Teu Rio
2014: Venha o Teu Reino
2015: Meu Abrigo
2017: DNA
2019: 15 Anos
Trazendo a Arca
2007: Marca da Promessa
2007: Ao Vivo no Japão
2008: Ao Vivo no Maracanãzinho
2009: Pra Tocar no Manto
2009: Salmos e Cânticos Espirituais
2012: Trazendo a Arca Deluxe Collection
Toque no Altar
2003: Toque no Altar
2004: Restituição
2005: Deus de Promessas
2006: Olha pra Mim
2007: Deus de Promessas Ao Vivo
2011: Ao Deus das Causas Impossíveis

References

External links

1975 births
Living people
21st-century Brazilian male singers
21st-century Brazilian singers
Brazilian gospel singers
Brazilian Christians
Christian music songwriters
People from Nova Iguaçu
Brazilian male singer-songwriters